Dinosaur in a Haystack is a 1995 book by the paleontologist Stephen Jay Gould. It collects essays culled from Gould's monthly column "The View of Life" published in Natural History magazine, which Gould contributed for 27 years. The book deals with themes familiar to Gould's writing: evolution, science biography, probabilities, and strange oddities found in nature.

His essay "Poe's Greatest Hit" analyzes the controversial conchology textbook The Conchologist's First Book (1839), edited by Edgar Allan Poe. Poe's volume on natural history sold out within two months, and was his only book republished during his lifetime. Essay "Dinomania" is a review of Michael Crichton's novel Jurassic Park and Steven Spielberg's blockbuster film of the same name.

Reception
The book received favorable reviews in Publishers Weekly and The New York Times.

References

External links
Up Against the Wall - by Steve Jones
Essay Summaries - by Lawrence N. Goeller
Dinosaur in a Haystack Review - by Danny Yee
Book review by Kathryn Denning
Two Cultures - by Howard A. Doughty, Innovation Journal
Dinosaur in a Haystack
Hooking Leviathan by Its Past
Dinomania
Cordelia's Dilemma
Of Tongue Worms, Velvet Worms, and Water Bears
Happy Thoughts on a Sunny Day in New York City
Dousing Diminutive Dennis's Debate&
Audio from the Prologue - MP3

1995 non-fiction books
American essay collections
English-language books
Dinosaur books
Science books
Works originally published in Natural History (magazine)
Books by Stephen Jay Gould